Andrea Viviano (22 June 1904 – 5 December 1962) was an Italian footballer who played as a defender. He competed in the 1928 Summer Olympics with the Italy national football team.

Career
Viviano was born in Alessandria. He won the Olympic bronze medal at the 1928 Summer Olympics in the football competition with Italy, but because of a disputed game in some accounts Olympic, his name is not listed among the medal winners.

Honours

International 
Italy
Olympic Bronze Medal: 1928

References

External links
Unione Sportiva Alessandria Calcio - CONTRIBUTION TO THE ITALIAN NATIONAL TEAM

1904 births
1962 deaths
Italian footballers
Footballers at the 1928 Summer Olympics
Olympic footballers of Italy
Olympic bronze medalists for Italy
Olympic medalists in football
Association football defenders
U.S. Alessandria Calcio 1912 players
Medalists at the 1928 Summer Olympics